Bamboo Édition is a French comics publisher, mostly specializing in humor series. Their manga imprint, Doki-Doki, was established in April 2006.

Doki-Doki Titles
7 Billion Needles
Antimagia
Atori shō
Aya no shiki
Broken Blade
Freezing
Fujoshi Rumi
Hanayamata
Hyakkiyakō shō 
Iris Zero
Laz Meridian
Musunde Hiraite
:REverSAL
Sasuga no Sarutobi
Taboo-Tattoo
Vamos Lá!
''The Sisters (fr)

See also
List of manga publishers

References

External links
 

1997 establishments in France
Comic book publishing companies of France
Manga distributors
Publishing companies established in 1997